The Rocket Battalion of Artillery (General Barry's), better known as the New York Rocket Battalion was an artillery battalion organized in the state of New York for service in the Union Army during the American Civil War.

History
The battalion was organized at Albany, December 5, 1861, and there mustered in the United States service for three years, December 6 and 7, 1861. The three companies recruited originally—Ransom's, Lee's and Sauer's—were consolidated into two companies on December 5 and the battalion, commanded by Maj. Thomas W. Lion, left the state on December 9.

It served at and near Washington, D. C., from December 1861, and in North Carolina, (2nd Brigade, 2nd Division, Dept. of North Carolina), from May 1862 until February 11, 1863, when the battalion organization was discontinued. The two companies, A and B, were designated the 23rd and 24th batteries of Light Artillery, having served provisionally as such from November 1, 1862. The loss and engagements of the battalion are included in the record of the batteries into which its two companies were converted.

Rocket artillery

During its months of service, the Rocket Battalion used eight breechloading cannon designed to fire Hale rockets. These were developed by Major Lions himself, and presented to President Lincoln shortly after the Battle of Bull Run in July 1861. They proved very unreliable during tests and in combat, so after the battalion was disbanded, each battery received regular M1857 12-pounder Napoleon's instead.

Service
Battle of New Bern, March 14, 1862.
Garrison duty at New Bern and Morehead City, North Carolina, until December, 1862.
Reconnaissance from New Bern to Young's Cross Roads July 26–29.
Action at Young's Cross Roads July 27.
Battalion discontinued November 1, 1862, and Company "A" designated 23rd Independent Battery New York Light Artillery. Company "B" designated 24th Independent Battery New York Light Artillery.

See also
List of New York Civil War units
Field Artillery in the American Civil War
Rocket artillery

References
 Phisterer, Frederick, New York in the War of the Rebellion, 18th ed. Albany: J. B. Lyon Company, 1912.

External links
Rocket Battalion

Artillery Rocket
1861 establishments in New York (state)
Artillery units and formations of the American Civil War
Military units and formations established in 1861
Military units and formations disestablished in 1862